Howard Welsch (1898–1980) was an American film producer. He owned Fidelity Pictures.

He was in charge of a producing unit at Universal which was dissolved in 1946. He formed Fidelity Pictures in 1948.

Select credits

Falling in Love (1934)
Men in Her Diary (1945)
The Daltons Ride Again (1945)
Smooth as Silk (1946)
Idea Girl (1946)
The Spider Woman Strikes Back (1946)
The Cat Creeps (1946)
Cuban Pete (1946)
The Dark Horse (1947)
The Michigan Kid (1947)
Philo Vance's Gamble (1947)
Philo Vance Returns (1947)
Return of the Vigilantes (1947)
Philo Vance's Secret Mission (1947)
House by the River (1950)
Woman on the Run (1950)
The Groom Wore Spurs (1951)
The San Francisco Story (1952)
Montana Belle (1952)
Rancho Notorious (1952)
A Bullet Is Waiting (1954)
Hot Blood (1956)

References

External links

American film producers
1898 births
1980 deaths